Gábor Boróczi (April 2, 1939 – May 2, 1991) was a former Hungarian ice hockey player. He played for the Hungary men's national ice hockey team at the 1964 Winter Olympics in Innsbruck.

References

1939 births
1991 deaths
Hungarian ice hockey forwards
Ice hockey players at the 1964 Winter Olympics
Olympic ice hockey players of Hungary
Ice hockey people from Budapest
Újpesti TE (ice hockey) players
20th-century Hungarian people